The 2015 Banja Luka Challenger was a professional tennis tournament played on clay courts. It was the fourteenth edition of the tournament which was part of the 2015 ATP Challenger Tour. It took place in Banja Luka, Bosnia and Herzegovina from 14 to 20 September 2015.

Singles main-draw entrants

Seeds

 Marcel Granollers, who was set as 2nd seed withdrew, due to right hip injury.
 1 Rankings are as of September 7, 2015.

Other entrants
The following players received wildcards into the singles main draw:
  Ilija Bozoljac 
  Flavio Cipolla 
  Jaume Munar 
  Jaroslav Pospíšil

The following players received entry from the qualifying draw:
  Petru-Alexandru Luncanu
  Sadio Doumbia 
  Axel Michon 
  Antonio Šančić

The following players received entry as lucky losers:
  Nicola Ghedin
  Jérôme Inzerillo

Champions

Singles

 Dušan Lajović def.  Victor Hănescu || 7-6(7–5), 7-6(7–5)

Doubles

 Ilija Bozoljac /  Flavio Cipolla def.  Jaroslav Pospíšil /  Jan Šátral, 6–2, 7–5

External links
Official Website

Banja Luka Challenger
Banja Luka Challenger
Banja Luka Challenger
Banja Luka Challenger